Tepetitlán is a town and one of the 84 municipalities of Hidalgo, in central-eastern Mexico. The municipality covers an area of 180 km².

As of 2005, the municipality had a total population of 8,893.

References 

Municipalities of Hidalgo (state)
Populated places in Hidalgo (state)